Ryan Baker is a former American football player.

Ryan Baker may also refer to:
 Ryan Baker (Home and Away), Home and Away character
 Ryan S. Baker (born 1977), education researcher and professor
 Ryan Baker, drummer in the American band Kane
 Ryan Baker, news anchor for WBBM-TV